Sri Lanka is a tropical island situated close to the southern tip of India. The invertebrate fauna is as large as it is common to other regions of the world. There are about 2 million species of arthropods found in the world, and still it is counting. So many new species are discover up to this time also. So it is very complicated and difficult to summarize the exact number of species found within a certain region.

This a list of the ephemeropterans found from Sri Lanka.

Mayfly
Phylum: Arthropoda   Class: Insecta
Order: Ephemeroptera

Mayflies or shadflies are aquatic insects belonging to the order Ephemeroptera. Over 3,000 species of mayfly are known worldwide, grouped into over 400 genera in 42 families.

Mayflies are relatively primitive insects and exhibit a number of ancestral traits that were probably present in the first flying insects, such as long tails and wings that do not fold flat over the abdomen. They are aquatic insects whose immature stages (called "naiads" or "nymphs") live in fresh water, where their presence indicates a clean, unpolluted environment. They are unique among insect orders in having a fully winged terrestrial adult stage, the subimago, which moults into a sexually mature adult, the imago.

In 1853, Walker first described about two species of mayflies from Sri Lanka. Then 1858, Hagen documented 8 more species from the country. The most useful taxonomic and other ecological aspects of mayflies of Sri Lanka came during 1960s and 1970s by Peters (1967) and Peters & Edmunds (1970). In 1965, Fernando described comprehensive work on mayflies. Through this, Hubbard and co-workers documented 46 species in 8 families from the country which is the most valuable source for present day as well. Currently there are 52 species of mayflies are reported from Sri Lanka, which belongs to 8 families.

Family: Baetidae
Acentrella feminalis (Eaton, 1885)
Baetis acceptus Muller-Liebenau & Hubbard 1985
Baetis collinus Muller-Liebenau & Hubbard, 1985
Baetis conservatus Muller-Liebenau & Hubbard, 1985
Baetis consuetus Hagen, 1853
Baetis frequentus Muller-Liebenau & Hubbard, 1985
Baetis pseudofrequentus Muller-Liebenau & Hubbard, 1985
Baetis solidus (Hagen, 1858)
Centroptella soldani Muller-Liebenau 1983
Chopralla ceylonensis (Muller-Liebenau 1983)
Chopralla similis (Muller-Liebenau 1983)
Cloeon marginale (Hagen, 1858)
Indobaetis costai Muller-Liebenau & Morihara, 1982
Indobaetis starmuehlneri Muller-Liebenau, 1982
Indocloeon primum Muller-Liebenau, 1982
Indocloeon secundum Kluge & Suttinun, 2020
Labiobaetis geminatus (Muller-Liebenau & Hubbard, 1985)
Labiobaetis ordinatum (Muller-Liebenau & Hubbard 1985)
Labiobaetis pulchellum (Muller-Liebenau & Hubbard 1985)
Liebebiella ambigua (Muller-Liebenau, 1982)
Liebebiella vera (Muller-Liebenau, 1982) [=Liebebiella difficila (Muller-Liebenau, 1982)]
Liebebiella klapaleki (Muller-Liebenau, 1982)
Liebebiella orientale (Muller-Liebenau, 1982)
Procloeon bimaculatum (Eaton, 1885)
Procloeon regularum Muller-Liebenau & Hubbard, 1985
Pseudocentroptiloides ceylonica Glazaczow, 1987

Family: Caenidae
Caenis perpusilla Walker, 1853
Clypeocaenis femorisetosa
Sparbarus gilliesi

Family: Ephemerellidae
Teloganodes hubbardi Sartori, 2008
Teloganodes insignis (Wang & McCafferty, 1996)
Teloganodes jacobusi Sartori, 2008
Teloganodes major Eaton, 1884
Teloganodes tristis (Hagen, 1858)
Teloganodes tuberculatus Sartori, 2008

Family: Ephemeridae
Ephemera hasakalensis Hubbard, 1983
Ephemera lankensis Hubbard, 1983
Ephemera nathani Hubbard, 1982
Ephemera supposita Eaton, 1883
Ephoron indicus (Pictet, 1843)
Povilla taprobanes Hubbard, 1984
Rhoenanthus posticus Banks, 1914

Family: Leptophlebiidae
Choroterpes signata (Hagen, 1858)
Isca serendiba Peters & Edmunds, 1970
Kimminsula annulata (Hagen, 1858)
Kimminsula fasciata (Hagen, 1858)
Kimminsula femoralis (Hagen, 1858)
Kimminsula taprobanes (Walker, 1853)
Megaglena brincki Peters & Edmunds, 1970

Family: Polymitarcyidae
Ephoron indica
Povilla taprobanes

Family: Prosopistomatidae
Prosopistoma lieftincki Peters, 1967

Family: Teloganodidae
Indoganodes tschertoprudi Martynov & Palatov, 2020

Family: Tricorythidae
Sparsorythus jacobsoni (Ulmer, 1913)

References

Sri Lanka
 
ephemeropterans